The Rockland Nationals are a Junior "A" ice hockey team from Rockland, Ontario, Canada.  They are a part of the Central Canada Hockey League. The Rockland Nationals will begin play in 2017-18, after the Gloucester Rangers relocated to Rockland after nearly 50 years in Gloucester.

History
The franchise dates back to the 1968 expansion Ottawa M.&.W (MacIntosh & Watts) Rangers and made their home in Leitrim in south Ottawa. In 1972, the M&W Rangers became the Gloucester Rangers and played out of the Earl Armstrong Arena. The 1972–73 season was coached by Derek Holmes, and included Mark Aubry as a player. The Rangers won their first Art Bogart Cup as league champions in 1981 by defeating the Pembroke Lumber Kings. The 1995 Centennial Cup (now Royal Bank Cup) was awarded to the City of Gloucester and the Gloucester Rangers. The Rangers, who were up by a goal in the championship game against the Calgary Canucks of the AJHL. The Canucks tied the game in the dying seconds and won the Centennial Cup in overtime. After their last playoff appearance of the 20th century, the Rangers fell on hard times missing the playoffs multiple times. 

In 2002, new owners decided to change the colours to Black, Purple, and Silver. The team rebuilt with blockbuster trades with cross-town rivals and defending league champions Ottawa Junior Senators. Unfortunately, the Rangers came close to winning the 2004 league championship by one goal in a sudden death game 7 to Nepean. In October 2004, coaching staff walking out of the organization over disagreements with management and ownership leaving the team with a shortage of players throughout the season through trades and releases. The team was sold to a group of Orleans businessmen in April 2005, who re-branded the team as the Orleans Blues, but couldn't move to Orleans, Ontario because of an inadequate arena, and therefore were forced to change back to the Gloucester Rangers for the 2008-09 season.

New ownership and final season in Gloucester
In late September 2016, Paul Jennings sold the Gloucester Rangers to a group of partners being André Chaput, André Charlebois & Amélie Lecompte, Jean-Robert Leger and Robert Bourdeau. Paul Jennings purchased the Orleans Blues franchise from Chaput in 2007. The Gloucester Rangers finished the 2016-17 season and relocated to Rockland, Ontario to become the Rockland Nationals after playing at the aging Earl Armstrong for nearly 50 years.

In 2020, the ownership team changed with the sale of André Chaput’s share to Luc Lavictoire and Julie Budd.

Season-by-season record
Note: GP = Games Played, W = Wins, L = Losses, T = Ties, OTL = Overtime Losses, GF = Goals for, GA = Goals against

Championships
CJHL Bogart Cup Championships: 1970, 1971, 1981, 1994 (Gloucester Rangers)
Centennial Cup Champions 1976 (Rockland Nationals]
Eastern Canadian Fred Page Cup Championships: None
CJAHL Royal Bank Cup Championships: None

https://www.rocklandnationalsjuniora.com/franchise-record

Notable alumni

Mark Aubry
John Barrett
Dan Boyle
Josh Bower
Todd Charlesworth
Mathieu Dandenault
P.C. Drouin
Blake Dunlop
Jerome Dupont
Robert Esche
Todd Flichel
Mark Fraser
Garry Galley
Steve Guenette
Derek Holmes
Mitch Lamoureux
Gary Laskoski
Claude Loiselle
Larry Robinson
Moe Robinson
Andre Savage
Larry Trader
Bob Warner
Steve Washburn
Sean Whyte

References

External links
Gloucester Rangers Webpage

Central Canada Hockey League teams
Ice hockey teams in Ottawa
Ice hockey clubs established in 1968
1968 establishments in Ontario